Maximilian Neuchrist and Tristan-Samuel Weissborn won the title, defeating Nikola Mektić and Antonio Šančić in the final 7–6(9–7), 6–3 .

Seeds

Draw

Draw

References
 Main Draw

Sparkassen ATP Challenger - Doubles
2015 Doubles